Airbertach mac Cosse, died 1016, was an Irish poet, lector and later superior of the monastery of Ros Ailithir (now Rosscarbery), on the coast of south-west County Cork. Rofessa i curp Domuin Dúir, a poem on the geography of the world, is ascribed to him in both the Rawlinson B 502 and the Book of Leinster.

References

Further reading
 http://www.answers.com/topic/airbertach-mac-cosse
 
 

People from Rosscarbery
Medieval Irish poets
11th-century Irish writers
Irish male poets
Irish-language writers
Gaels